Saifuddin Ahmed (1927 – 27 September 2010) was a Bangladeshi actor. He acted in around 400 films and over 100 television plays. He won a Bangladesh National Film Award for Best Supporting Actor for his role in the film Sundori (1979).

Career
Ahmed started his acting career through Mukh O Mukhosh, the first feature film in Bengali language produced in East Pakistan (now Bangladesh).

Works

Personal life
Ahmed married to Sufia Ahmed on 16 June 1960. They had a son Saeed Ahmed, and three daughters, Farzana Ahmed (Shikha), Farzia Ahmed (Shimmi) and Farrukhi Ahmed (Shaji).

References

External links

1927 births
2010 deaths
Bangladeshi male film actors
Burials at Banani Graveyard
Best Supporting Actor National Film Award (Bangladesh) winners